The 1907 Colgate football team was an American football team that represented Colgate University as an independent during the 1907 college football season. In its second season under head coach Bill Warner, the team compiled a 4–4–1 record. W. Lynn Housemann was the team captain. The team played its home games on Whitnall Field in Hamilton, New York.

Schedule

References

Colgate
Colgate Raiders football seasons
Colgate football